Butylo is an unincorporated community in Essex and Middlesex counties, in the U.S. state of Virginia.

References

Unincorporated communities in Virginia
Unincorporated communities in Essex County, Virginia
Unincorporated communities in Middlesex County, Virginia